Christopher Lamont can refer to:

 Christopher Lamont (cricketer), a Jamaican cricketer
 Christopher Lamont (volleyball), a British volleyball player